PC Exchange was a utility program for Apple Macintosh computers. It was a control panel for the classic Mac OS that lets the operating system mount FAT file systems and mapped file extensions to the user-defined type and creator codes. 

It was first made available in 1992 as a commercial software product from Apple, but in 1993, it was no longer a commercial product on its own, and shipped with System 7 Pro as part of Apple's push to become more compatible with Microsoft Windows. It worked transparently, mounting the disks on the desktop as if they were normal Mac disks, with the exception of the large letters PC on the icon which were visually similar to the IBM logotype. Originally only floppy disks were supported, but later versions added support for hard drives, CD-ROMs and other types of media.

PC Exchange is not used in macOS, which uses a completely different driver architecture to read the FAT file system.

Compatibility layers
Classic Mac OS
Apple Inc. file systems